The 1945 Bromley by-election was held on 14 November 1945.  The byelection was held due to the death of the incumbent Conservative MP, Edward Campbell.  It was won by the Conservative candidate Harold Macmillan.

References

Bromley by-election
Bromley,1945
Bromley by-election
Bromley,1945
Bromley,1945
1940s in Kent
Harold Macmillan